The 1986 European Cup Winners' Cup Final was a football match contested between Atlético Madrid of Spain and FC Dynamo Kyiv of the Soviet Union. It was the final match of the 1985–86 European Cup Winners' Cup and the 26th competition final.

The final game was held at Stade de Gerland in Lyon, France. Kyiv won the match 3–0 thanks to goals by Aleksandr Zavarov, Oleg Blokhin and Vadim Yevtushenko.

Route to the final

Match

Details

See also
1985–86 European Cup Winners' Cup
1986 European Cup Final
1986 UEFA Cup Final
Atlético Madrid in European football
FC Dynamo Kyiv in European football

References

External links
UEFA Cup Winners' Cup results at Rec.Sport.Soccer Statistics Foundation

3
Cup Winners' Cup Final 1986
Cup Winners' Cup Final 1986
International club association football competitions hosted by France
UEFA Cup Winners' Cup Finals
Cup
Euro
Sports competitions in Lyon
May 1986 sports events in Europe
20th century in Lyon